Dennie Olde Kalter (born 22 October 1991) is a professional Dutch darts player, who currently plays mainly in World Darts Federation events.

Career
In September 2019, he qualified for the 2020 BDO World Darts Championship, where he beat Nick Kenny in the First Round before losing to Mario Vandenbogaerde in the Last 16.

World Championship results

BDO/WDF
 2020: Second round (lost to Mario Vandenbogaerde 1–4)
 2023:

References

External links
 

Living people
Dutch darts players
Sportspeople from Hengelo
1991 births